BossBabes is a New Zealand reality television series produced by Warner Bros. International Television New Zealand for TVNZ+. Season 1 debuted on August 6, 2019 and Season 2 began on April 7, 2020. Season 3 premiered on November 9, 2022. The show follows two Auckland influencers and businesswomen, Iyia Liu and Edna Swart, who run their own social media e-commerce businesses.

During the first season, Iyia Liu owns a confectionary delivery company, Celebration Box, while helping her friend Edna launch a bodycare product line titled Ed&i Body as a "complimentary side product to Ed&i Swimwear". Liu is also featured undergoing a Brazilian butt lift procedure before her first pregnancy with her boyfriend Jordan Delmont, whom she first meets in the first episode of Season 1. Episodes for the first season were filmed in Auckland, New Zealand, Sydney, Australia and Bali, Indonesia. 

In the second season, Liu gives birth to her first child named Summer. Swart becomes engaged to her fiancé Alex and embarks on her honeymoon. Episodes for the second season were filmed in Auckland and Pretoria, South Africa.

The third season follows Swart through her hens day and subsequent wedding to Reid Stephen. Liu's Tidal Hair business is booming and her first daughter Summer is now two. Liu and Delmont's new home in Coatesville begins construction and Liu announces her pregnancy. Episodes for the third season were filmed in Auckland and Nadi, Fiji.

The series was produced by Warner Bros. International Television Production NZ. A fourth season of the series is not yet in production.

Series overview

Cast

Controversy 
While media critics and influencers initially praised and promoted the series, BossBabes has become the subject of criticism on social media. Most criticism was aimed at Iyia Liu and problems surrounding her dessert delivery company, Celebration Box, which was under investigation by the Commerce Commission for possibly violating the Fair Trading Act.

Iyia Liu was also featured in an investigation into money laundering by the National Business Review and Auckland blogger Alex Janssen, citing Liu's financial ties to a defunct property scheme, called Future Living, run by her mother and controversial developer, Dan "Robert" McEwan. As a result of the investigation, Iyia Liu's ties to the alleged pyramid scheme were exposed, linking her to a series of corporate registrations and investments through a personal family trust, which included the purchase and a mortgage for property in the affluent rural community of Coatesville. The suspect property, a partly built mansion, was featured by 1 News and other news outlets in 2018 as her second mansion, despite records showing that she only owned the Coatesville property that is under construction.

National Business Review journalist, Calida Stuart-Menteath, won New Zealand Business Journalist of 2019 at the Voyager Media Awards because her investigation into Iyia Liu "provided important and highly relevant context about her family connections."

During filming of the second season of BossBabes, Liu founded a new company Tidal Hair which drew questions over its suspiciously high follower count upon launch. As a result, Tidal Hair's Instagram page was terminated in February 2020, but was later reactivated.

References

External links 
 BossBabes Official website

2019 New Zealand television series debuts
English-language television shows
New Zealand reality television series
Television shows set in Auckland
2020s New Zealand television series
TVNZ original programming
TVNZ